The Chattanooga, Rome and Southern Railroad was formed out of a reorganization of the Chattanooga, Rome and Columbus Railroad in 1897 and three years later, it purchased the Chattanooga and Durham Railroad.  Then in 1901 the CR&S was purchased by the Central of Georgia Railway.

Defunct Georgia (U.S. state) railroads
Defunct Tennessee railroads
Predecessors of the Central of Georgia Railway
Railway companies established in 1897
Railway companies disestablished in 1901